Portishead Point Lighthouse, which is more commonly known as Battery Point Lighthouse, in Portishead, Somerset, England was built in 1931.

History 
The  lighthouse was built at Battery Point by the Chance Brothers of Smethwick. It was established in 1931 as an unwatched automatic light. It consists of a black metal pyramid on a concrete base.

Originally it had been intended to provide Portishead Point with a diaphone fog signal, but in response to local unrest at the prospect the decision was taken to commission a fog bell instead. The two tonne bell was cast by Gillett & Johnston of Croydon in 1938, and installed the following year. Due to structural concerns the bell was removed in 1998; later, following public campaigning for restoration, the bell was acquired by Portishead Town Council and returned to the town in 2012. It is installed in Wyndham Way close to the High Street.

The lighthouse is maintained by the Bristol Port Company. The light was refurbished in 2012.

Gallery

See also 

 List of lighthouses in England

References

External links 

 

Lighthouses completed in 1931
Lighthouses in Somerset
Buildings and structures in North Somerset
Portishead, Somerset